Mickey's Space Adventure is a graphic adventure game for a number of platforms. It was designed by Roberta Williams and released by Sierra On-Line in 1984. It features the Disney characters Mickey Mouse and Pluto.

Plot
The plot involves an alien race losing a precious crystal that contains all of their recorded history, split into nine pieces and hidden throughout Earth's solar system. While out walking Pluto, Mickey Mouse stumbles upon a spaceship sent by the aliens and is charged with searching the planets (and several moons) for the pieces of the crystal.

Development
Written in 1984 by Roberta Williams, the game was a joint project with Disney prior to their collaboration on The Black Cauldron. The game was intended for children. While there were several similar games featuring Disney characters, Mickey's Space Adventure is not considered part of a larger series. The PC version was released on two 360 KB 5¼" disks.

See also
List of Disney video games

References

External links

1984 video games
Apple II games
Commodore 64 games
DOS games
Classic Mac OS games
TRS-80 Color Computer games
Adventure games
Sierra Entertainment games
Mickey Mouse video games
Children's educational video games
ScummVM-supported games
Video games scored by Al Lowe
Video games set in outer space
Video games developed in the United States
Single-player video games